Pitt Meadows—Maple Ridge—Mission (formerly Dewdney—Alouette) was a federal electoral district in British Columbia, Canada, that was represented in the House of Commons of Canada from 1997 to 2015.

Demographics

Geography
The district includes the northwestern quarter of the Fraser Valley Regional District (which includes Mission, Kent, Nicomen Island, and Lake Erock), and the District Municipalities of Maple Ridge and Pitt Meadows and their vicinities.

History
The electoral district was created in 1996 as "Dewdney—Alouette" riding from parts of Fraser Valley East and Mission—Coquitlam ridings. Its name was changed in 2004 to "Pitt Meadows—Maple Ridge—Mission" in 2004.

The 2012 electoral redistribution saw this riding split into Pitt Meadows—Maple Ridge and Mission—Matsqui—Fraser Canyon for the 2015 election, the former Conservative MP Randy Kemp retired, with the Liberal Party picking up both new ridings.

Members of Parliament

Election results

Pitt Meadows–Maple Ridge–Mission

Dewdney—Alouette

See also
 List of Canadian federal electoral districts
 Past Canadian electoral districts

References

 Expenditures – 2004
 Expenditures – 2000
 Expenditures – 1997

Notes

External links
 Website of the Parliament of Canada

Former federal electoral districts of British Columbia
Federal electoral districts in Greater Vancouver and the Fraser Valley
Maple Ridge, British Columbia
Mission, British Columbia
Pitt Meadows